Sarath Muttetuwegama (29 December 1917 – 19 May 1986) was a Sri Lankan lawyer and communist politician. He was a member of parliament from Kalawana.

Born Sarathchandra Muttetuwegama to the Rate Mahatmaya of Kalawana, Muttetuwegama qualified as an advocate. A member of the Communist Party, he unsuccessfully contested the March 1960, 1965 general elections from Ratnapura. He was elected to parliament in the 1970 general election from Kalawana. He lost the 1977 general election to Abeyratne Pilapitiya, however when Pilapitiya was unseated in an election petition, Muttetuwegama was elected in the by-election at followed 1981. He was killed in a car crash in Ratnapura in 1986, while in office.

He married Manouri de Silva, a barrister who was the daughter of Dr Colvin R. de Silva a leftist politician and lawyer.

References 

1935 births
1986 deaths
Ceylonese advocates
Communist Party of Sri Lanka politicians
Members of the 7th Parliament of Ceylon
Members of the 8th Parliament of Sri Lanka
Sinhalese lawyers
Sinhalese politicians